Sanna Maarit Antikainen (born 3 October 1988 in Kuopio) is a Finnish politician currently serving in the Parliament of Finland for the Finns Party at the Savonia-Karelia constituency.

References

1988 births
Living people
People from Kuopio
Finns Party politicians
Members of the Parliament of Finland (2019–23)
Women members of the Parliament of Finland
21st-century Finnish women politicians